"Santa's Coming for Us" is a song written by Sia and Greg Kurstin and released on 30 October 2017 as the lead single from Sia's eighth studio album and first Christmas album, Everyday Is Christmas.

Background and release 
Sia wrote "Santa's Coming for Us" with her long-time collaborator Greg Kurstin, who also produced the song. In an interview with Entertainment Weekly, Kurstin said that writing the song "took me back to when we used to get into jazz chord changes", referencing Sia's early career.

Music video
The music video for "Santa's Coming for Us" was released on 22 November 2017 and stars Kristen Bell hosting a Christmas party. Guests include Dax Shepard as the husband, JB Smoove as Santa Claus, Susan Lucci and Henry Winkler as the grandparents, and Sophia Lillis, Wyatt Oleff, and Caleb McLaughlin as the children.

Track listing
 "Santa's Coming for Us" – 3:26

Charts

Weekly charts

Year-end charts

Certifications

See also
 List of number-one adult contemporary singles of 2017 (U.S.)

References

2017 singles
2017 songs
American Christmas songs
Sia (musician) songs
Song recordings produced by Greg Kurstin
Songs about Santa Claus
Songs written by Greg Kurstin
Songs written by Sia (musician)
Atlantic Records singles